Klimovskaya is a rural locality (a village) in Kalininskoye Rural Settlement, Totemsky District, Vologda Oblast, Russia. The population was 52 as of 2002.

Geography 
Klimovskaya is located 28 km southwest of Totma (the district's administrative centre) by road. Maximovskaya is the nearest rural locality.

References 

Rural localities in Totemsky District